Paul Stepney Smith (born 5 October 1967) is an English retired professional footballer who made over 100 appearances in the Football League for Torquay United, Brentford and Bristol Rovers as a right winger. His career was ended prematurely by injury.

Career statistics

References

1967 births
Living people
Footballers from Wembley
English footballers
Association football wingers
Brentford F.C. players
Arsenal F.C. players
Bristol Rovers F.C. players
Torquay United F.C. players
English Football League players